Eileenella is a genus of parasitoid wasps in the family Ibaliidae, containing the single species Eileenella catherinae from Papua New Guinea.

References

Cynipoidea
Monotypic Hymenoptera genera